HR 8799 b is an extrasolar planet located approximately 129 light-years away in the constellation of Pegasus, orbiting the 6th magnitude Lambda Boötis star HR 8799.  It has a mass between 4 and 7 Jupiter masses and a radius from 10 to 30% larger than Jupiter's. It orbits at 68 AU from HR 8799 (or 7 AU inside the inner edge of the dust disk orbiting the star) with an unknown eccentricity and a period of 460 years, and is the outermost known planet in the HR 8799 system.  Along with two other planets orbiting HR 8799, the planet was discovered on November 13, 2008 by Marois et al., using the Keck and Gemini observatories in Hawaii.  These planets were discovered using the direct imaging technique.

In 2009 it was discovered that the Hubble Space Telescope had in fact directly imaged HR 8799 b eleven years earlier, in 1998, suggesting that more exoplanets might be revealed through analysis of HST photographic archives.  Additional precovery images were also obtained by reanalyzing data taken in 2002 at the Subaru Telescope and in 2005 and 2007 at the W.M Keck Observatory 

Broadband photometry of HR 8799 b shows that it has thicker clouds in its atmosphere than do older, higher surface gravity substellar objects of the same effective temperature.
Near infrared H band and K band spectroscopy of HR8799b published in May 2011 indicate a hydrogen rich, dusty atmosphere with disequilibrium CO / CH4 chemistry.

Near infrared spectroscopy made with the Palomar Observatory show evidence of ammonia and/or acetylene as well as carbon dioxide, and some methane. In 2015, the signals of water, carbon monoxide and methane were reported in infrared spectra taken at the Keck telescope. However, a reanalysis of the same data in 2018 shows that water and carbon monoxide are present, but that the methane detection may have been spurious. Observations by the James Webb Space Telescope will be capable of confirming or disproving the presence of methane in HR 8799 b's atmosphere.



See also
 Fomalhaut b

Notes

References

External links

 

HR 8799
Exoplanets discovered in 2008
Giant planets
Pegasus (constellation)
Exoplanets detected by direct imaging